Tue Brook House, 695 West Derby Road, Liverpool was built in 1615 as a farmhouse. It is now owned by a local family. It is thought to have been originally owned by  John Mercer, a yeoman farmer and during the Victorian period was the home and workshop of a Mr.Fletcher, a wheelwright. Some parts of the building contain sections of its original "wattle and daub" construction, which can be seen through glass panels. Also containing a priest hide located in the chimney breast between two of the bedrooms. 
The house is currently owned by a local Liverpool family.

External links
Picture circa 1900

Grade II* listed buildings in Liverpool
Houses completed in 1615
1615 establishments in England